There are several individuals regarded Serbian folk heroes. Most of them were medieval people, enumerated in Serbian epic poetry. The list includes:

 Lazar of Serbia (1329–1389), ruler, fell at the Battle of Kosovo (1389).
 Miloš Obilić (d. 1389), knight, killed Ottoman Sultan Murad I at Kosovo (1389).
 Prince Marko (1335–1395), prince, active during the fall of the Serbian Empire.
 Karađorđe (1768–1817), leader of the Serbian Revolution.

See also
Symbols of Serbia
National founders of Serbia

References

Serbian folklore
National symbols of Serbia
Folk heroes
Folk heroes